CT-1, CT1 and CT 1 can refer to:
 ČT1, a television channel in the Czech Republic
 CT1, a cordless telephone standard
 Cosina CT-1, a 35mm film SLR camera
 Connecticut's 1st congressional district
 Connecticut Route 1
U.S. Route 1 in Connecticut
 Cardiotrophin 1
 Core Tier 1 Capital